Jurgenson or Jürgenson is a Scandinavian surname variant of the Danish surname Jurgensen. The name is common in Estonia.

List of people with the surname Jurgenson or Jürgenson
Aili Jürgenson (1931–2017), birth name of Estonian patriot Aili Jõgi
Christine Jurgenson, Canadian curler
Kalle Jürgenson (born 1960), Estonian astrophysicist and politician
Luba Jurgenson, French writer of Estonian/Russian origin
Markus Jürgenson (born 1987), Estonian footballer
Pyotr Ivanovich Jurgenson (1836–1904), composer and founder of the P. Jurgenson music publishing firm

Patronymic surnames
Surnames from given names